In algebraic geometry, a morphism of schemes generalizes a morphism of algebraic varieties just as a scheme generalizes an algebraic variety. It is, by definition, a morphism in the category of schemes.

A morphism of algebraic stacks generalizes a morphism of schemes.

Definition 
By definition, a morphism of schemes is just a morphism of locally ringed spaces.

A scheme, by definition, has open affine charts and thus a morphism of schemes can also be described in terms of such charts (compare the definition of morphism of varieties). Let ƒ:X→Y be a morphism of schemes. If x is a point of X, since ƒ is continuous, there are open affine subsets U = Spec A of X containing x and V = Spec B of Y such that ƒ(U) ⊆ V. Then ƒ: U → V is a morphism of affine schemes and thus is induced by some ring homomorphism B → A (cf. #Affine case.) In fact, one can use this description to "define" a morphism of schemes; one says that ƒ:X→Y is a morphism of schemes if it is locally induced by ring homomorphisms between coordinate rings of affine charts.

Note: It would not be desirable to define a morphism of schemes as a morphism of ringed spaces. One trivial reason is that there is an example of a ringed-space morphism between affine schemes that is not induced by a ring homomorphism (for example, a morphism of ringed spaces:

More conceptually, the definition of a morphism of schemes needs to capture "Zariski-local nature" or localization of rings; this point of view (i.e., a local-ringed space) is essential for a generalization (topos).

Then, for each point x of X, the homomorphisms on the stalks:

is a local ring homomorphism: i.e.,  and so induces an injective homomorphism of residue fields
.
(In fact, φ maps th n-th power of a maximal ideal to the n-th power of the maximal ideal and thus induces the map between the (Zariski) cotangent spaces.)

For each scheme X, there is a natural morphism

which is an isomorphism if and only if X is affine; θ is obtained by gluing U → target which come from restrictions to open affine subsets U of X. This fact can also be stated as follows: for any scheme X and a ring A, there is a natural bijection:

(Proof: The map  from the right to the left is the required bijection. In short, θ is an adjunction.)

Moreover, this fact (adjoint relation) can be used to characterize an affine scheme: a scheme X is affine if and only if for each scheme S, the natural map

is bijective.

A morphism as a relative scheme 
Fix a scheme S, called a base scheme. Then a morphism  is called a scheme over S or an S-scheme; the idea of the terminology is that it is a scheme X together with a map to the base scheme S. For example, a vector bundle E → S over a scheme S is an S-scheme.

An S-morphism from p:X →S to q:Y →S is a morphism ƒ:X →Y of schemes such that p = q ∘ ƒ. Given an S-scheme , viewing S as an S-scheme over itself via the identity map, an S-morphism  is called a S-section or just a section.

All the S-schemes form a category: an object in the category is an S-scheme and a morphism in the category an S-morphism. (Succinctly, this category is the slice category of the category of schemes with the base object S.)

Affine case 
Let  be a ring homomorphism and let 

 

be the induced map. Then

 is continuous.
If  is surjective, then  is a homeomorphism onto its image.
For every ideal I of A, 
 has dense image if and only if the kernel of  consists of nilpotent elements. (Proof: the preceding formula with I = 0.) In particular, when B is reduced,  has dense image if and only if  is injective.

Let f: Spec A → Spec B  be a morphism of schemes between affine schemes with the pullback map : B → A. That it is a morphism of locally ringed spaces translates to the following statement: if  is a point of Spec A,
.
(Proof: In general,  consists of g in A that has zero image in the residue field k(x); that is, it has the image in the maximal ideal . Thus, working in the local rings, . If , then  is a unit element and so  is a unit element.)

Hence, each ring homomorphism B → A defines a morphism of schemes Spec A → Spec B and, conversely, all morphisms between them arise this fashion.

Examples

Basic ones 
Let R be a field or  For each R-algebra A, to specify an element of A, say f in A, is to give a R-algebra homomorphism  such that . Thus, . If X is a scheme over S = Spec R, then taking  and using the fact Spec is a right adjoint to the global section functor, we get  where . Note the equality is that of rings.
Similarly, for any S-scheme X, there is the identification of the multiplicative groups:  where  is the multiplicative group scheme.
Many examples of morphisms come from families parameterized by some base space.

Graph morphism 
Given a morphism of schemes  over a scheme S, the morphism  induced by the identity  and f  is called the graph morphism of f. The graph morphism of the identity is called the diagonal morphism.

Types of morphisms

Finite type 
Morphisms of finite type are one of the basic tools for constructing families of varieties. A morphism  is of finite type if there exists a cover  such that the fibers  can be covered by finitely many affine schemes  making the induced ring morphisms  into finite-type morphisms. A typical example of a finite-type morphism is a family of schemes. For example,

is a morphism of finite type. A simple non-example of a morphism of finite-type is  where  is a field. Another is an infinite disjoint union

Closed immersion 
A morphism of schemes  is a closed immersion if the following conditions hold:
  defines a homeomorphism of  onto its image
  is surjective
This condition is equivalent to the following: given an affine open  there exists an ideal  such that

Examples 
Then if we take the open subset  the ideal sheaf is  while on the affine open  there is no ideal since the subset does not intersect this chart.

Separated 
Separated morphisms define families of schemes which are "Hausdorff". For example, given a separated morphism  in  the associated analytic spaces  are both Hausdorff. We say a morphism of scheme  is separated if the diagonal morphism  is a closed immersion. In topology, an analogous condition for a space  to be Hausdorff is if the diagonal set

Nevertheless, most schemes are not Hausdorff as topological spaces, as the Zariski topology is in general highly non-Hausdorff.

Examples 
Most morphisms encountered in scheme theory will be separated. For example, consider the affine scheme

over  Since the product scheme is

the ideal defining the diagonal is generated by

showing the diagonal scheme is affine and closed. This same computation can be used to show that projective schemes are separated as well.

Non-examples 
The only time care must be taken is when you are gluing together a family of schemes. For example, if we take the diagram of inclusions

then we get the scheme-theoretic analogue of the classical line with two-origins.

Proper 
A morphism  is called proper if
 it is separated
 of finite-type
 universally closed
The last condition means that given a morphism  the base change morphism  is a closed immersion. Most known examples of proper morphisms are in fact projective; but, examples of proper varieties which are not projective can be found using toric geometry.

Projective 
Projective morphisms define families of projective varieties over a fixed base scheme. Note that there are two definitions: Hartshornes which states that a morphism  is called projective if there exists a closed immersion  and the EGA definition which states that a scheme  is projective if there is a quasi-coherent -module of finite type such that there is a closed immersion . The second definition is useful because an exact sequence of  modules can be used to define projective morphisms.

Projective morphism over a point 
A projective morphism  defines a projective scheme. For example,

Family of projective hypersurfaces 
If we let  then the projective morphism

defines a family of Calabi-Yau manifolds which degenerate.

Lefschetz pencil 
Another useful class of examples of projective morphisms are Lefschetz Pencils: they are projective morphisms  over some field . For example, given smooth hypersurfaces  defined by the homogeneous polynomials  there is a projective morphism

 

giving the pencil.

EGA projective 
A nice classical example of a projective scheme is by constructing projective morphisms which factor through rational scrolls. For example, take  and the vector bundle . If we want to construct a projective morphism using this sheaf we can take an exact sequence, such as

which defines the structure sheaf of the projective scheme  in

Flat

Intuition 
Flat morphisms have an algebraic definition but have a very concrete geometric interpretation: flat families correspond to families of varieties which vary "continuously". For example,

is a family of smooth affine quadric curves which degenerate to the normal crossing divisor

at the origin.

Properties 
One important property that a flat morphism must satisfy is that the dimensions of the fibers should be the same.

Definition 
Let  be a morphism of schemes. It is also faithfully flat if it is a surjective morphism.

Non-example 
Using our geometric intuition it obvious that

But, we can also check this using the definition with local algebra: Consider the ideal  Since  we get a local algebra morphism

If we tensor

This shows that the morphism is not flat.

Unramified 
A morphism  of affine schemes is unramified if . We can use this for the general case of a morphism of schemes .

Geometric example 
One example of a morphism which is flat and generically unramified, except for at a point, is

We can compute the relative differentials using the sequence

showing

if we take the fiber , then the morphism is ramified since

otherwise we have

showing that it is unramified everywhere else.

Etale 
A morphism of schemes  is called étale if it is flat and unramfied. These are the algebro-geometric analogue of covering spaces. The two main examples to think of are covering spaces and finite separable field extensions. Examples in the first case can be constructed by looking at  branched coverings and restricting to the unramified locus.

Morphisms as points 

By definition, if X, S are schemes (over some base scheme or ring B), then a morphism from S to X (over B) is an S-point of X and one writes:

for the set of all S-points of X. This notion generalizes the notion of solutions to a system of polynomial equations in classical algebraic geometry. For a B-algebra R, to give an R-point of X is to give an algebra homomorphism A →R, which in turn amounts to giving a homomorphism

that kills fi's. Thus, there is a natural identification:

Example: If X is an S-scheme with structure map π: X → S, then an S-point of X (over S) is the same thing as a section of π.

In category theory, Yoneda's lemma says that, given a category C,  the contravariant functor

is fully faithful (where  means the category of presheaves on C). Applying the lemma to C = the category of schemes over B, this says that a scheme over B is determined by its various points.

It turns out that in fact it is enough to consider S-points with only affine schemes S, precisely because schemes and morphisms between them are obtained by gluing affine schemes and morphisms between them. Because of this, one usually writes X(R) = X(Spec R) and view X as a functor from the category of commutative B-algebras to Sets.

Example: Given S-schemes X, Y with structure maps p, q,
.

Example: With B still denoting a ring or scheme, for each B-scheme X, there is a natural bijection
 { the isomorphism classes of line bundles L on X together with n + 1 global sections generating L. };
in fact, the sections si of L define a morphism . (See also Proj construction#Global Proj.)

Remark: The above point of view (which goes under the name functor of points and is due to Grothendieck) has had a significant impact on the foundations of algebraic geometry. For example, working with a category-valued (pseudo-)functor instead of a set-valued functor leads to the notion of a stack, which allows one to keep track of morphisms between points.

Rational map 

A rational map of schemes is defined in the same way for varieties. Thus, a rational map from a reduced scheme X to a separated scheme Y is an equivalence class of a pair  consisting of an open dense subset U of X and a morphism . If X is irreducible, a rational function on X is, by definition, a rational map from X to the affine line  or the projective line 

A rational map is dominant if and only if it sends the generic point to the generic point.

A ring homomorphism between function fields need not induce a dominant rational map (even just a rational map). For example, Spec k[x] and Spec k(x) and have the same function field (namely, k(x)) but there is no rational map from the former to the latter. However, it is true that any inclusion of function fields of algebraic varieties induces a dominant rational map (see morphism of algebraic varieties#Properties.)

See also 
Regular embedding
Constructible set (topology)
Universal homeomorphism

Notes

References 

Milne, Review of Algebraic Geometry at Algebraic Groups: The theory of group schemes of finite type over a field.
Vakil, Foundations of Algebraic Geometry

Algebraic geometry